Carly Motors is a Dutch motorsports company. Carly Motors started tuning racing engines but grew into one of the top teams of the European Touring Car Championship and the Guia Race of Macau between 2001 and 2004.

History
Carly Pellinkhof started her chip tuning company in 1979. Her company supported the Mercedes-Benz factory supported teams in the Deutsche Tourenwagen Meisterschaft. In 1992 Pellinkhof started her own racing team.

Deutsche Tourenwagen Meisterschaft
Carly Motors ran a BMW M3 in the 1991 Deutsche Tourenwagen Meisterschaft. Entered under Marlboro BMW Dealer Team Cor Euser was the team's sole driver. Eusers best result was a thirteenth place at the Norisring.

Dutch Touring Car Championship
Carly Motors entered four BMW 325i's in the 1992 Dutch Production Car Championship. Marcel van Vliet, Ger van Krimpen, Heikki Salmenoutio and Salvatore Santisi raced the cars in the 'over 2000cc' class. Van Vliet was the first driver to win during the season, at Circuit Zandvoort. While Team Lotus driver Tom Langeberg won the championship, Carly Motors drivers Van Vliet and Salmenoutio finished second and third.

Starting in 1997 the Dutch Touring Car Championship following Group N regulations was formed. Under the name H&P Panorama Team Carly Motors started the season with Duncan Huisman and Sandor van Es. The duo dominated the inaugural season with Huisman taking the title and Van Es finishing second in the series standings. Van Es and Huisman remained at the H&P Panorama Team for 1998. The team faced heavy competition, mainly from Renault. Van Es won three races and placed second in the series standings. Cor Euser returned to the team in 1999. Euser won five races and clinched the championship in the final weekend over Frans Verschuur. For 2000 the team returned to dominance with Huisman and Van Es but it was sometimes controversial. In the second round of the championship the team won both races but was later disqualified on technical grounds. During the third round of the championship Van Es was leading the race but let Huisman pass in the last round. Pellinkhof ordered Van Es to slow down to let Huisman pass. The team won nine out of thirteen races with Huisman winning the championship over Van Es. Huisman won the series championship over Van Es. In 2001 the Carly Motors built BMW's again caused controversy. Their dominance was questioned by other teams. Some of the teams wanted the organisation to add weight to the Carly Motors cars. Van Es won two races but was a constant top five finisher to clinch the championship. Teammate Tom Coronel made his debut in the series winning three races and ended fifth in the standings. In 2002 the Dutch Touring Car Championship struggled to attract a representative grid. A low point was reached in July when only nine cars started the race. The championship was won by Huisman winning nine races out of fifteen. Teammate Molenaar finished third in the championship. The duo was split by Renault works driver Jeroen Bleekemolen.

European Touring Car Championship
With the Super Production class added to the European Touring Car Championship in 2001 Carly Motors joined the series. The team raced the championship with two BMW 320i's for Dutchman Duncan Huisman and Swede Peggen Andersson. The duo competed the full season while Carly Motors entered three other cars in selected races. Huisman started the season strong with two second place finishes, only beaten by countryman Peter Kox. Huisman won at Magny-Cours, Zolder and the Hungaroring. Huisman settled for second in the championship, behind Kox. Andersson settled for seventh in the championship with two fourth places as his best result. At the season finale at Estoril two guest drivers scored the best results for Carly Motors. Sandor van Es and Tom Coronel finished second and third, behind CiBiEmme Team driver Gianni Morbidelli.

For 2002 the Super Production, FIA Group N, became the main class of the championship, replacing Super Touring.

Current company
Carly Motors continues to fine-tune engines, with a focus on software remapping for raceteams with cars competing on the highest level of motorsport as well as regular street and muscle cars. Carly Motors delivers taylormade remapping of the Engine Controle Unit (ECU) for the best needed performance within the safe zone.

Motorsport results

Deutsche Tourenwagen Meisterschaft
(key) (Races in bold indicate pole position) (Races in italics indicate fastest lap)

European Touring Car Championship
(key) (Races in bold indicate pole position) (Races in italics indicate fastest lap)

Guia Race of Macau

References

Dutch auto racing teams
Vehicle manufacturing companies established in 1979
Deutsche Tourenwagen Masters teams
European Touring Car Championship
Dutch racecar constructors
Dutch companies established in 1979